The following lists events that happened during 2011 in Laos.

Incumbents
Party General Secretary: Choummaly Sayasone
President: Choummaly Sayasone
Vice President:  Bounnhang Vorachith
Prime Minister: Thongsing Thammavong

Events

May
 May 10 - Laos announces the results of elections to its one-party parliament.

References

 
Laos
Years of the 21st century in Laos
2010s in Laos
Laos